Impact of the COVID-19 pandemic on football may refer to:

Impact of the COVID-19 pandemic on association football
Impact of the COVID-19 pandemic on gridiron football